Porter Township is a township in Huntingdon County, Pennsylvania, United States. The population was 1,968 at the 2010 census.

History
The Juniata Iron Works, Barree Forge and Furnace, and Pulpit Rocks are listed on the National Register of Historic Places.

Geography
According to the United States Census Bureau, the township has a total area of 35.6 square miles (92.3 km2), of which 35.4 square miles (91.6 km2)  is land and 0.2 square mile (0.6 km2)  (0.67%) is water.

Demographics

As of the census of 2000, there were 1,917 people, 768 households, and 565 families residing in the township.  The population density was 54.2 people per square mile (20.9/km2).  There were 870 housing units at an average density of 24.6/sq mi (9.5/km2).  The racial makeup of the township was 99.27% White, 0.21% African American, 0.10% Asian, 0.26% from other races, and 0.16% from two or more races. Hispanic or Latino of any race were 0.63% of the population.

There were 768 households, out of which 30.6% had children under the age of 18 living with them, 60.0% were married couples living together, 9.2% had a female householder with no husband present, and 26.4% were non-families. 23.3% of all households were made up of individuals, and 11.1% had someone living alone who was 65 years of age or older.  The average household size was 2.50 and the average family size was 2.93.

In the township the population was spread out, with 23.7% under the age of 18, 6.7% from 18 to 24, 26.1% from 25 to 44, 29.7% from 45 to 64, and 13.8% who were 65 years of age or older.  The median age was 41 years. For every 100 females there were 96.8 males.  For every 100 females age 18 and over, there were 91.7 males.

The median income for a household in the township was $38,145, and the median income for a family was $43,813. Males had a median income of $30,863 versus $23,819 for females. The per capita income for the township was $16,764.  About 8.3% of families and 10.7% of the population were below the poverty line, including 15.3% of those under age 18 and 7.3% of those age 65 or over.

References

Townships in Huntingdon County, Pennsylvania
Townships in Pennsylvania